Ecuadendron is a monotypic genus of flowering plants in the legume family, Fabaceae, containing the single species Ecuadendron acosta-solisianum. It is endemic to Ecuador, where it is known from three populations on the coast. It is threatened because the wood is valuable and it is vulnerable to logging.

References

Detarioideae
Endemic flora of Ecuador
Endangered plants
Plants described in 1998
Monotypic Fabaceae genera
Taxonomy articles created by Polbot